Christine Koggel is Professor of Philosophy at Carleton University in Ottawa, Canada. She is a specialist in development ethics, particularly on the ethics of care.

Academic career 
Before her appointment at  Carleton University in 2013, she was Harvey Wexler Professor of Philosophy and Co-Director of the Center for International Studies at Bryn Mawr College.

Publications

Perspectives on Equality: Constructing a Relational Theory. Lanham, MD: Rowman & Littlefield, 1998.
Contemporary Moral Issues. 5th ed. Co-ed/  with Wesley Cragg. Toronto: McGraw-Hill, 2005.
Moral Issues in Global Perspective. 2nd edition in 3 volumes (Volume I: Moral and Political Theory; Volume II: Human Diversity and Equality; Volume III: Moral Issues). Editor. Peterborough:Broadview Press, 2006.
"Care Ethics: New Theories and Applications." First Special Issue of Ethics and Social Welfare. v.4 no. 2   July 2010. Guest Ed.with Joan Orme.  
"Care Ethics: New Theories and Applications." Second Special Issue of Ethics and Social Welfare. v.5 no. 2,   July 2011. Guest Ed, with Joan Orme.  
"Gender Justice: Local and Global." Special Issue of Ethics and Social Welfare. v.6, no. 3, September 2012. Guest Ed. with Cynthia Bisman.
Care Ethics: New Theories and Applications. Reprint of two special issues of Ethics and Social Welfare.   Co-editor with Joan Orme, Routledge, 2013.
Our Faithfulness to the Past: The Ethics and Politics of Memory. Sue Campbell. Edited by Christine Koggel and Rockney Jacobsen. Oxford University Press, 2014

References

Year of birth missing (living people)
Living people
Canadian ethicists
Academic staff of Carleton University
Bryn Mawr College faculty